Elected Cossacks were cossacks who were economically independent from various institutions and participated in military services using their own weapons. Following the reforms of the Russian occupation government in 1734, cossacks were divided into two groups: Elected Cossacks and Cossack Helpers.

References

 Elect Cossacks in Encyclopedia of Ukraine

History of the Cossacks in Russia